Flandersville is an unincorporated community in Wahkiakum County, Washington. The elevation is 46 feet.

References

Unincorporated communities in Wahkiakum County, Washington
Unincorporated communities in Washington (state)